Tristan und Isolde (Tristan and Isolde), WWV 90, is an opera in three acts by Richard Wagner to a German libretto by the composer, based largely on the 12th-century romance Tristan and Iseult by Gottfried von Strassburg. It was composed between 1857 and 1859 and premiered at the Königliches Hoftheater und Nationaltheater in Munich on 10 June 1865 with Hans von Bülow conducting. Wagner referred to the work not as an opera, but called it "" (literally a drama, a plot, or an action).

Wagner's composition of Tristan und Isolde was inspired by the philosophy of Arthur Schopenhauer (particularly The World as Will and Representation), as well as by Wagner's affair with Mathilde Wesendonck. Widely acknowledged as a pinnacle of the operatic repertoire, Tristan was notable for Wagner's unprecedented use of chromaticism, tonal ambiguity, orchestral colour, and harmonic suspension.

The opera was enormously influential among Western classical composers and provided direct inspiration to composers such as Gustav Mahler, Richard Strauss, Alban Berg, Arnold Schoenberg, and Benjamin Britten. Other composers like Claude Debussy, Maurice Ravel, and Igor Stravinsky formulated their styles in contrast to Wagner's musical legacy. Many see Tristan as a milestone on the move away from common practice harmony and tonality and consider that it lays the groundwork for the direction of classical music in the 20th century. Both Wagner's libretto style and music were also profoundly influential on the symbolist poets of the late 19th century and early 20th century.

Composition history

Wagner was forced to abandon his position as conductor of the Dresden Opera in 1849, as there was a warrant posted for his arrest for his participation in the unsuccessful May Revolution. He left his wife, Minna, in Dresden, and fled to Zürich. There, in 1852, he met the wealthy silk trader Otto Wesendonck. Wesendonck became a supporter of Wagner and bankrolled the composer for several years. Wesendonck's wife, Mathilde, became enamoured of the composer. Though Wagner was working on his epic Der Ring des Nibelungen, he found himself intrigued by the legend of Tristan and Isolde.

The story of Tristan and Isolde is a quintessential romance of the Middle Ages and the Renaissance. Several versions of the story exist, the earliest dating to the middle of the 12th century. Gottfried's version, part of the "courtly" branch of the legend, had a huge influence on later German literature.

According to his autobiography, Mein Leben, Wagner decided to dramatise the Tristan legend after his friend, Karl Ritter, attempted to do so, writing that:

He had, in fact, made a point of giving prominence to the lighter phases of the romance, whereas it was its all-pervading tragedy that impressed me so deeply that I felt convinced it should stand out in bold relief, regardless of minor details.

This influence, together with his discovery of the philosophy of Arthur Schopenhauer in October 1854, led Wagner to find himself in a "serious mood created by Schopenhauer, which was trying to find ecstatic expression. It was some such mood that inspired the conception of a Tristan und Isolde."

Wagner wrote of his preoccupations with Schopenhauer and Tristan in a letter to Franz Liszt (16 December 1854): Never in my life having enjoyed the true happiness of love I shall erect a memorial to this loveliest of all dreams in which, from the first to the last, love shall, for once, find utter repletion. I have devised in my mind a Tristan und Isolde, the simplest, yet most full-blooded musical conception imaginable, and with the ‘black flag’ that waves at the end I shall cover myself over – to die.

By the end of 1854, Wagner had sketched out all three acts of an opera on the Tristan theme, based on Gottfried von Strassburg's telling of the story. While the earliest extant sketches date from December 1856, it was not until August 1857 that Wagner began devoting his attention entirely to the opera, putting aside the composition of Siegfried to do so. On 20 August he began the prose sketch for the opera, and the libretto (or poem, as Wagner preferred to call it) was completed by 18 September. Wagner, at this time, had moved into a cottage built in the grounds of Wesendonck's villa, where, during his work on Tristan und Isolde, he became passionately involved with Mathilde Wesendonck. Whether or not this relationship was platonic remains uncertain. One evening in September of that year, Wagner read the finished poem of "Tristan" to an audience including his wife, Minna, his current muse, Mathilde, and his future mistress (and later wife), Cosima von Bülow.

By October 1857, Wagner had begun the composition sketch of the first act. During November, however, he set five of Mathilde's poems to music known today as the Wesendonck Lieder. This was an unusual move by Wagner, who almost never set to music poetic texts other than his own. Wagner described two of the songs – "Im Treibhaus" and "Träume" – as "Studies for Tristan und Isolde": "Träume" uses a motif that forms the love duet in Act II of Tristan, while "Im Treibhaus" introduces a theme that later became the prelude to Act III. But Wagner resolved to write Tristan only after he had secured a publishing deal with the Leipzig-based firm Breitkopf & Härtel, in January 1858. From this point on, Wagner finished each act and sent it off for engraving before he started on the next – a remarkable feat given the unprecedented length and complexity of the score.

In April 1858 Wagner's wife Minna intercepted a note from Wagner to Mathilde and, despite Wagner's protests that she was putting a "vulgar interpretation" on the note, she accused first Wagner and then Mathilde of unfaithfulness. After enduring much misery, Wagner persuaded Minna, who had a heart condition, to rest at a spa while Otto Wesendonck took Mathilde to Italy. It was during the absence of the two women that Wagner began the composition sketch of the second act of Tristan. However, Minna's return in July 1858 did not clear the air, and on 17 August, Wagner was forced to leave both Minna and Mathilde and move to Venice.

Wagner would later describe his last days in Zurich as "a veritable Hell". Minna wrote to Mathilde before departing for Dresden: I must tell you with a bleeding heart that you have succeeded in separating my husband from me after nearly twenty-two years of marriage. May this noble deed contribute to your peace of mind, to your happiness.

Wagner finished the second act of Tristan during his eight-month exile in Venice, where he lived in the Palazzo Giustinian. In March 1859, fearing extradition to Saxony, where he was still considered a fugitive, Wagner moved to Lucerne where he composed the last act, completing it in August 1859.

Premiere
Tristan und Isolde proved to be a difficult opera to stage, and Wagner considered various possibilities for the venue. In 1857 he was invited by a representative of Pedro II, Emperor of Brazil, to stage his operas in Rio de Janeiro (in Italian, the language of the Imperial Opera); he told Liszt he was considering settling in Rio, and that that city would be given the honour of premiering Tristan. Wagner sent the Emperor bound copies of his earlier operas in expression of his interest, but nothing more came of the plan. He then proposed that the premiere take place in Strasbourg, following interest in the project shown by the Grand Duchess of Baden. Again, the project failed to eventuate. His thoughts then turned to Paris, the centre of the operatic world in the middle of the 19th century. However, after a disastrous staging of Tannhäuser at the Paris Opéra, Wagner offered the work to the Karlsruhe opera in 1861.

When Wagner visited the Vienna Court Opera to rehearse possible singers for this production, the management at Vienna suggested staging the opera there. Originally, the tenor Alois Ander was employed to sing the part of Tristan, but later proved incapable of learning the role. Parallel attempts to stage the opera in Dresden, Weimar and Prague failed. Despite over 70 rehearsals between 1862 and 1864, Tristan und Isolde was unable to be staged in Vienna, winning the opera a reputation as unperformable.

It was only after King Ludwig II of Bavaria became a sponsor of Wagner (he granted the composer a generous stipend, and supported Wagner's artistic endeavours in other ways) that enough resources could be found to mount the premiere of Tristan und Isolde. Hans von Bülow was chosen to conduct the production at the Nationaltheater in Munich, despite the fact that Wagner was having an affair with his wife, Cosima von Bülow. Even then, the planned premiere on 15 May 1865 had to be postponed until the Isolde, Malvina Schnorr von Carolsfeld, had recovered from hoarseness. The work finally premiered on 10 June 1865, with Malvina's husband Ludwig partnering her as Tristan.

On 21 July 1865, having sung the role only four times, Ludwig died suddenly – prompting speculation that the exertion involved in singing the part of Tristan had killed him. (The stress of performing Tristan has also claimed the lives of conductors Felix Mottl in 1911 and Joseph Keilberth in 1968. Both men died after collapsing while conducting the second act of the opera.) Malvina sank into a deep depression over her husband's death, and never sang again, although she lived for another 38 years.

For some years thereafter, the only performers of the roles were another husband–wife team, Heinrich Vogl and Therese Vogl.

Performance history

The next production of Tristan was in Weimar in 1874. Wagner himself supervised another production of Tristan in Berlin in March 1876, but the opera was only performed in his own theatre at the Bayreuth Festival after his death; Cosima Wagner, his widow, oversaw this in 1886, a production that was widely acclaimed.

The first production outside of Germany was given at the Theatre Royal, Drury Lane, London in 1882; Tristan was performed by Hermann Winkelmann, who later that year sang the title role of Parsifal at Bayreuth. It was conducted by Hans Richter, who also conducted the first Covent Garden production two years later. Winkelmann was also the first Vienna Tristan, in 1883. The first American performance was held at the Metropolitan Opera in December 1886, conducted by Anton Seidl.

Significance in the development of romantic music
The score of Tristan und Isolde has often been cited as a landmark in the development of Western music. Throughout the opera, Wagner uses a remarkable range of orchestral colour, harmony, and polyphony, doing so with a freedom rarely found in his earlier operas. The very first chord in the piece, the Tristan chord, is of great significance in the move away from traditional tonal harmony as it resolves to another dissonant chord:

The opera is noted for its numerous expansions of harmonic practice; for instance, one significant innovation is the frequent use of two consecutive chords containing tritones (diminished fifth or augmented fourth), neither of which is a diminished seventh chord (F–B, bar 2; E–A-sharp, bar 3). Tristan und Isolde is also notable for its use of harmonic suspension – a device used by a composer to create musical tension by exposing the listener to a series of prolonged unfinished cadences, thereby inspiring a desire and expectation on the part of the listener for musical resolution. While suspension is a common compositional device (in use since before the Renaissance), Wagner was one of the first composers to employ harmonic suspension over the course of an entire work. The cadences first introduced in the prelude are not resolved until the finale of Act III, and, on a number of occasions throughout the opera, Wagner primes the audience for a musical climax with a series of chords building in tension – only to deliberately defer the anticipated resolution. One particular example of this technique occurs at the end of the love duet in Act II ("Wie sie fassen, wie sie lassen...") where Tristan and Isolde gradually build up to a musical climax, only to have the expected resolution destroyed by the dissonant interruption of Kurwenal ("Rette Dich, Tristan!"). The deferred resolution is frequently interpreted as symbolising both physical sexual release and spiritual release via suicide – the long-awaited completion of this cadence series arrives only in the final "Liebestod" ("Love-Death"), during which the musical resolution (at "In des Welt-Atems wehendem All") coincides with the moment of Isolde's death.

The tonality of Tristan was to prove immensely influential in western Classical music. Wagner's use of musical colour also influenced the development of film music. Bernard Herrmann's score for Alfred Hitchcock's classic, Vertigo, is heavily reminiscent of the Liebestod, most evidently in the resurrection scene. The Liebestod was incorporated in Luis Buñuel's Surrealist film L'Age d'Or. Not all composers, however, reacted favourably: Claude Debussy's piano piece "Golliwog's Cakewalk" mockingly quotes the opening of the opera in a distorted form, instructing the passage to be played ''. However, Debussy was highly influenced by Wagner and was particularly fond of Tristan. Frequent moments of Tristan-inspired tonality mark Debussy's early compositions.

Roles

Instrumentation
Tristan und Isolde is scored for the following instruments:
 3 flutes (one doubles piccolo), 2 oboes, cor anglais, 2 clarinets, bass clarinet, 3 bassoons
 4 horns, 3 trumpets, 3 trombones, bass tuba
 timpani, cymbals, triangle
 harp
 1st and 2nd violins, violas, violoncellos, and double basses (Die Streichinstrumente sind vorzüglich gut und stark zu besetzen. [The string instruments are to be exquisitely cast in quantity and quality.])

on-stage
 cor anglais, 6 horns, 3 trumpets, 3 trombones

Synopsis

Act I

Isolde, promised to King Marke in marriage, and her handmaid, Brangäne, are quartered aboard Tristan's ship being transported to the king's lands in Cornwall. The opera opens with the voice of a young sailor singing of a "wild Irish maid" ("Westwärts schweift der Blick"), which Isolde construes to be a mocking reference to herself. In a furious outburst, she wishes the seas to rise up and sink the ship, killing herself and all on board ("Erwache mir wieder, kühne Gewalt"). Her scorn and rage are directed particularly at Tristan, the knight responsible for taking her to Marke, and Isolde sends Brangäne to command Tristan to appear before her ("Befehlen liess' dem Eigenholde"). Tristan, however, refuses Brangäne's request, claiming that his place is at the helm. His henchman, Kurwenal, answers more brusquely, saying that Isolde is in no position to command Tristan and reminds Brangäne that Isolde's previous fiancé, Morold, was killed by Tristan ("Herr Morold zog zu Meere her").

Brangäne returns to Isolde to relate these events, and Isolde, in what is termed the "narrative and curse", sadly tells her of how, following the death of Morold, she happened upon a stranger who called himself Tantris. Tantris was found mortally wounded in a barge ("von einem Kahn, der klein und arm") and Isolde used her healing powers to restore him to health. She discovered during Tantris' recovery, however, that he was actually Tristan, the murderer of her fiancé. Isolde attempted to kill the man with his own sword as he lay helpless before her. However, Tristan looked not at the sword that would kill him or the hand that wielded the sword, but into her eyes ("Er sah' mir in die Augen"). His gaze pierced her heart and she was unable to slay him. Tristan was allowed to leave with the promise never to come back, but he later returned with the intention of marrying Isolde to his uncle, King Marke. Isolde, furious at Tristan's betrayal, insists that he drink atonement to her, and from her medicine chest produces a vial to make the drink. Brangäne is shocked to see that it is a lethal poison.

Kurwenal appears in the women's quarters ("Auf auf! Ihr Frauen!") and announces that the voyage is coming to an end. Isolde warns Kurwenal that she will not appear before the King if Tristan does not come before her as she had previously ordered and drink atonement to her. When Tristan arrives, Isolde reproaches him about his conduct and tells him that he owes her his life and how his actions have undermined her honour, since she blessed Morold's weapons before battle and therefore she swore revenge. Tristan first offers his sword but Isolde refuses; they must drink atonement. Brangäne brings in the potion that will seal their pardon; Tristan knows that it may kill him, since he knows Isolde's magic powers ("Wohl kenn' ich Irlands Königin"). The journey almost at its end, Tristan drinks and Isolde takes half the potion for herself. The potion seems to work, but instead of death, it brings relentless love ("Tristan!" "Isolde!"). Kurwenal, who announces the imminent arrival on board of King Marke, interrupts their rapture. Isolde asks Brangäne which potion she prepared and Brangäne replies, as the sailors hail the arrival of King Marke, that it was not poison; rather, she has substituted a love potion in order to save Isolde from herself.

Act II
King Marke leads a hunting party out into the night, leaving Isolde and Brangäne alone in the castle, who both stand beside a burning brazier. Isolde, listening to the hunting horns, believes several times that the hunting party is far enough away to warrant the extinguishing of the brazier – the prearranged signal for Tristan to join her ("Nicht Hörnerschall tönt so hold"). Brangäne warns Isolde that Melot, one of King Marke's knights, has seen the amorous looks exchanged between Tristan and Isolde and suspects their passion ("Ein Einz'ger war's, ich achtet' es wohl"). Isolde, however, believes Melot to be Tristan's most loyal friend, and, in a frenzy of desire, extinguishes the flames. Brangäne retires to the ramparts to keep watch as Tristan arrives.

The lovers, at last alone and freed from the constraints of courtly life, declare their passion for each other. Tristan decries the realm of daylight which is false, unreal, and keeps them apart. It is only in night, he claims, that they can truly be together and only in the long night of death can they be eternally united ("O sink' hernieder, Nacht der Liebe"). During their long tryst, Brangäne calls a warning several times that the night is ending ("Einsam wachend in der Nacht"), but her cries fall upon deaf ears. The day breaks in on the lovers as Melot leads King Marke and his men to find Tristan and Isolde in each other's arms. Marke is heartbroken, not only because of his nephew's betrayal but also because Melot chose to betray his friend Tristan to Marke and because of Isolde's betrayal as well ("Mir – dies? Dies, Tristan – mir?").

When questioned, Tristan says he cannot answer to the King the reason of his betrayal since he would not understand. He turns to Isolde, who agrees to follow him again into the realm of night. Tristan announces that Melot has fallen in love with Isolde too. Melot and Tristan fight, but, at the crucial moment, Tristan throws his sword aside and allows Melot to stab him.

Act III

Kurwenal has brought Tristan home to his castle at Kareol in Brittany. A shepherd pipes a mournful tune and asks if Tristan is awake. Kurwenal replies that only Isolde's arrival can save Tristan, and the shepherd offers to keep watch and claims that he will pipe a joyful tune to mark the arrival of any ship. Tristan awakes ("Die alte Weise – was weckt sie mich?") and laments his fate – to be, once again, in the false realm of daylight, once more driven by unceasing unquenchable yearning ("Wo ich erwacht' weilt ich nicht"). Tristan's sorrow ends when Kurwenal tells him that Isolde is on her way. Tristan, overjoyed, asks if her ship is in sight, but only a sorrowful tune from the shepherd's pipe is heard.

Tristan relapses and recalls that the shepherd's mournful tune is the same as was played when he was told of the deaths of his father and mother ("Muss ich dich so versteh'n, du alte, ernst Weise"). He rails once again against his desires and against the fateful love potion ("verflucht sei, furchtbarer Trank!") until, exhausted, he collapses in delirium. After his collapse, the shepherd is heard piping the arrival of Isolde's ship, and, as Kurwenal rushes to meet her, Tristan tears the bandages from his wounds in his excitement ("Hahei! Mein Blut, lustig nun fliesse!"). As Isolde arrives at his side, Tristan dies with her name on his lips.

Isolde collapses beside her deceased lover just as the appearance of another ship is announced. Kurwenal spies Melot, Marke and Brangäne arriving ("Tod und Hölle! Alles zur Hand!"). He believes they have come to kill Tristan and, in an attempt to avenge him, furiously attacks Melot. Marke tries to stop the fight to no avail. Both Melot and Kurwenal are killed in the fight. Marke and Brangäne finally reach Tristan and Isolde. Marke, grieving over the body of his "truest friend" ("Tot denn alles!"), explains that Brangäne revealed the secret of the love potion and that he had come not to part the lovers, but to unite them ("Warum Isolde, warum mir das?"). Isolde appears to wake at this and in a final aria describing her vision of Tristan risen again (the "Liebestod", "love death"), dies ("Mild und leise wie er lächelt").

Influence of Schopenhauer on Tristan und Isolde

Wagner's friend the poet Georg Herwegh introduced him in late 1854 to the work of the philosopher Arthur Schopenhauer. The composer was immediately struck by the philosophical ideas to be found in The World as Will and Representation (Die Welt als Wille und Vorstellung), and the similarities between the two men's world-views became clear.

Man, according to Schopenhauer, is driven by continued, unachievable desires, and the gulf between our desires and the possibility of achieving them leads to misery while the world is a representation of an unknowable reality. Our representation of the world is Phenomenon, while the unknowable reality is Noumenon: concepts originally posited by Kant. Schopenhauer's influence on Tristan und Isolde is most evident in the second and third acts. The second act, in which the lovers meet, and the third act, during which Tristan longs for release from the passions that torment him, have often proved puzzling to opera-goers unfamiliar with Schopenhauer's work.

Wagner uses the metaphor of Day and Night in the second act to designate the realms inhabited by Tristan and Isolde. The world of Day is one in which the lovers are bound by the dictates of King Marke's court and in which the lovers must smother their mutual love and pretend as if they do not care for each other: it is a realm of falsehood and unreality. Under the dictates of the realm of Day, Tristan was forced to remove Isolde from Ireland and to marry her to his Uncle Marke – actions against Tristan's secret desires. The realm of Night, in contrast, is the representation of intrinsic reality, in which the lovers can be together and their desires can be openly expressed and reach fulfilment: it is the realm of oneness, truth and reality and can only be achieved fully upon the deaths of the lovers. The realm of Night, therefore, becomes also the realm of death: the only world in which Tristan and Isolde can be as one forever, and it is this realm that Tristan speaks of at the end of Act II ("Dem Land das Tristan meint, der Sonne Licht nicht scheint"). In Act III, Tristan rages against the daylight and frequently cries out for release from his desires (Sehnen). In this way, Wagner implicitly equates the realm of Day with Schopenhauer's concept of Phenomenon and the realm of Night with Schopenhauer's concept of Noumenon. While none of this is explicitly stated in the libretto, Tristan's comments on Day and Night in Acts II and III, as well as musical allusions to Tristan in Die Meistersinger von Nürnberg and Parsifal make it very clear that this was, in fact, Wagner's intention. 

The world-view of Schopenhauer dictates that the only way for man to achieve inner peace is to renounce his desires: a theme that Wagner explored fully in his last opera, Parsifal. In fact Wagner even considered having the character of Parsifal meet Tristan during his sufferings in Act III, but later rejected the idea.

Opinion against Schopenhauer influence 
Klaas A. Posthuma argues that neither Tristan nor Isolde tries for one moment to ignore feelings of love for the other or to overcome them. On the contrary, they yield to their feelings with all their hearts – but secretly. Such behavior has nothing whatever to do with Schopenhauer's claim. Another important point in Schopenhauer's philosophy is his view that happiness cannot be found with one woman only – his reason for never marrying. But for Tristan there is only one woman, Isolde, with Death as alternative. And this leads to the inevitable conclusion that it was not Schopenhauer and his doctrine that were responsible for creating of Wagner's sublime music drama but his own unfulfilled longing for the woman he met and loved during these years, Mathilde Wesendonck.

Reactions to Tristan und Isolde
Although Tristan und Isolde is now widely performed in major opera houses around the world, critical opinion of the opera was initially unfavourable. The 5 July 1865 edition of the Allgemeine musikalische Zeitung reported:

Eduard Hanslick's reaction in 1868 to the prelude to Tristan was that it "reminds one of the old Italian painting of a martyr whose intestines are slowly unwound from his body on a reel." The first performance in London's Drury Lane Theatre drew the following response from The Era in 1882:

Mark Twain, on a visit to Germany, heard Tristan at Bayreuth and commented: "I know of some, and have heard of many, who could not sleep after it, but cried the night away. I feel strongly out of place here. Sometimes I feel like the one sane person in the community of the mad; sometimes I feel like the one blind man where all others see; the one groping savage in the college of the learned, and always, during service, I feel like a heretic in heaven."

Clara Schumann wrote that Tristan und Isolde was "the most repugnant thing I have ever seen or heard in all my life".

With the passage of time, Tristan became more favourably regarded. In an interview shortly before his death, Giuseppe Verdi said that he "stood in wonder and terror" before Wagner's Tristan. In The Perfect Wagnerite, writer and satirist George Bernard Shaw writes that Tristan was "an astonishingly intense and faithful translation into music of the emotions which accompany the union of a pair of lovers" and described it as "a poem of destruction and death". Richard Strauss, initially dismissive of Tristan, claimed that Wagner's music "would kill a cat and would turn rocks into scrambled eggs from fear of [its] hideous discords." Later, however, Strauss became part of the Bayreuth coterie and writing to Cosima Wagner in 1892 declared: "I have conducted my first Tristan. It was the most wonderful day of my life." In 1935 he wrote to Joseph Gregor, one of his librettists, that Tristan und Isolde was "the end of all romanticism, as it brings into focus the longing of the entire 19th century."

The conductor Bruno Walter heard his first Tristan und Isolde in 1889 as a student:

Arnold Schoenberg referred to Wagner's technique of shifting chords in Tristan as "phenomena of incredible adaptability and nonindependence roaming, homeless, among the spheres of keys; spies reconnoitering weaknesses; to exploit them in order to create confusion, deserters for whom surrender of their own personality is an end in itself".

Friedrich Nietzsche, who in his younger years was one of Wagner's staunchest allies, wrote that, for him, "Tristan and Isolde is the real opus metaphysicum of all art ... insatiable and sweet craving for the secrets of night and death ... it is overpowering in its simple grandeur". In a letter to his friend Erwin Rohde in October 1868, Nietzsche described his reaction to Tristan's prelude: "I simply cannot bring myself to remain critically aloof from this music; every nerve in me is atwitch, and it has been a long time since I had such a lasting sense of ecstasy as with this overture". Even after his break with Wagner, Nietzsche continued to consider Tristan a masterpiece: "Even now I am still in search of a work which exercises such a dangerous fascination, such a spine-tingling and blissful infinity as Tristan – I have sought in vain, in every art."

Marcel Proust, greatly influenced by Wagner, refers to Tristan und Isolde and its "inexhaustible repetitions" throughout his novel In Search of Lost Time. He describes the prelude theme as "linked to the future, to the reality of the human soul, of which it was one of the most special and distinctive ornaments."

Recordings

Tristan und Isolde has a long recorded history and most of the major Wagner conductors since the end of the First World War have had their interpretations captured on disc. The limitations of recording technology meant that until the 1930s it was difficult to record the entire opera, however recordings of excerpts or single acts exist going back to 1901, when excerpts of Tristan were captured on the Mapleson Cylinders recorded during performances at the Metropolitan Opera.

In the years before World War II, Kirsten Flagstad and Lauritz Melchior were considered to be the prime interpreters of the lead roles, and mono recordings exist of this pair in a number of live performances led by conductors such as Thomas Beecham, Fritz Reiner, Artur Bodanzky and Erich Leinsdorf. Flagstad recorded the part commercially only near the end of her career in 1952, under Wilhelm Furtwängler for EMI, producing a set which is considered a classic recording.

Following the war, another classic recording is the 1952 performance at the Bayreuth Festival with Martha Mödl and Ramón Vinay under Herbert von Karajan, which is noted for its strong, vivid characterizations and is now available as a live recording. In the 1960s, the soprano Birgit Nilsson was considered the major Isolde interpreter, and she was often partnered with the Tristan of Wolfgang Windgassen. Their performance at Bayreuth in 1966 under the baton of Karl Böhm was captured by Deutsche Grammophon – a performance often hailed as one of the best Tristan recordings.

Karajan did not record the opera officially until 1971–72. Karajan's selection of a lighter soprano voice (Helga Dernesch) as Isolde, paired with an extremely intense Jon Vickers and the unusual balance between orchestra and singers favoured by Karajan was controversial. In the 1980s recordings by conductors such as Carlos Kleiber, Reginald Goodall, and Leonard Bernstein were mostly considered to be important for the interpretation of the conductor, rather than that of the lead performers. The set by Kleiber is notable as Isolde was sung by the famous Mozartian soprano Margaret Price, who never sang the role of Isolde on stage. The same is true for Plácido Domingo, who sang the role of Tristan to critical acclaim in the 2005 EMI release under the baton of Antonio Pappano despite never having sung the role on stage. In the last ten years acclaimed sets include a studio recording with the Berlin Philharmonic by Daniel Barenboim and a live set from the Vienna Staatsoper led by Christian Thielemann.

There are several DVD productions of the opera including Götz Friedrich's production at the Deutsche Oper in Berlin featuring the seasoned Wagnerians René Kollo and Dame Gwyneth Jones in the title roles. Deutsche Grammophon released a DVD of a Metropolitan Opera performance featuring Jane Eaglen and Ben Heppner, conducted by James Levine, in a production staged by Dieter Dorn and a DVD of the 1993 Bayreuth Festival production with conductor Daniel Barenboim and featuring Waltraud Meier as Isolde and Siegfried Jerusalem as Tristan, staged by Heiner Müller. More recently Barenboim's production at La Scala, Milan, in the production by Patrice Chéreau has also been issued on DVD. There is also a technically flawed, but historically important video recording with Birgit Nilsson and Jon Vickers from a 1973 live performance at the Théâtre antique d'Orange, conducted by Karl Böhm.

In a world first, the British opera house Glyndebourne made a full digital video download of the opera available for purchase online in 2009. The performance stars Robert Gambill as Tristan, Nina Stemme as Isolde, Katarina Karnéus as Brangäne, Bo Skovhus as Kurwenal, René Pape as King Marke, and Stephen Gadd as Melot, with Jiří Bělohlávek as the conductor, and was recorded on 1 and 6 August 2007.

A performance typically lasts approximately 3 hours and 50 minutes.

Concert extracts and arrangements
The Prelude and Liebestod is a concert version of the overture and Isolde's Act III aria, "Mild und leise". The arrangement was by Wagner himself, and it was first performed in 1862, several years before the premiere of the complete opera in 1865. The Liebestod can be performed either in a purely orchestral version, or with a soprano singing Isolde's vision of Tristan resurrected.

However, the very first time the prelude and its opening "Tristan chord" was heard publicly was on 12 March 1859, when it was performed at the Sophieninselsaal in Prague, in a charity concert in aid of poor medical students, conducted by Hans von Bülow, who provided his own concert ending for the occasion. Wagner had authorised such an ending, but did not like what Bülow had done with it and later wrote his own. Wagner then included the prelude in his own three concerts at the Paris Théâtre-Italien in January–February 1860.

Wagner called the prelude the "Liebestod" (Love-death) while Isolde's final aria "Mild und leise" he called the "Verklärung" (Transfiguration). In 1867 his father-in-law Franz Liszt made a piano transcription of "Mild und leise", which he called "Liebestod" (S.447); he prefaced his score with a four-bar motto from the love duet from Act II, which in the opera is sung to the words "sehnend verlangter Liebestod". Liszt's transcription became well known throughout Europe well before Wagner's opera reached most places, and it is Liszt's title for the final scene that persists. The transcription was revised in 1875.

Wagner wrote a concert ending for the Act II Love Duet for a planned 1862 concert performance that did not eventuate. The music was lost until 1950, then passed into private hands, before coming to the attention of Daniel Barenboim, who passed it on to Sir Antonio Pappano. The first recording of the Love Duet with the concert ending was made in 2000, with Plácido Domingo, Deborah Voigt and the Orchestra of the Royal Opera House under Pappano.

Another composer to rework material from Tristan was Emmanuel Chabrier in his humorous Souvenirs de Munich – quadrilles on themes from Wagner's Tristan und Isolde. These were augmented and orchestrated by Markus Lehmann in 1988. Leopold Stokowski made a series of purely orchestral "Symphonic Syntheses" of Wagner's operas during his time as conductor of the Philadelphia Orchestra, bringing to concert audiences of the 1920s and '30s music they might not otherwise have heard. A shorter version of music from the 2nd and 3rd acts was called "Love Music from Tristan and Isolde". He made recordings of both versions on 78s and again on LP.

The British composer Ronald Stevenson has made two arrangements based on the opera. The first is The Fugue on the Shepherd's Air from Tristan und Isolde from 1999. Its composition was inspired by a lecture given by the Wagner biographer and chair of the Wagner Society of Scotland, Derek Watson, to whom the piece is dedicated. In a contrapuntal climax, Stevenson combines both the Shepherd's Air and Isolde's Liebestod. The second is a setting, for voices and organ, of lines from Tom Hubbard's  1998 narrative poem in Scots, 'Isolde's Luve-Daith', the premiere of which took place in Greyfriars Kirk, Edinburgh in March 2003.

Other works based on the opera include:
 Luis Buñuel, Un Chien Andalou, 1929 film score, Opera Frankfurt, director Carl Bamberger
 Clément Doucet's piano rags Isoldina and Wagneria.
 Hans Werner Henze's Tristan: Préludes für Klavier, Tonbänder und Orchester (1973);
 a 'symphonic compilation' Tristan und Isolde: an orchestral passion (1994) by Henk de Vlieger;
 a six-minute paraphrase by Enjott Schneider, Der Minuten-Tristan (1996), originally written for 12 pianists at six pianos;
 An arrangement of "Prelude und Liebestod" for string quartet and accordion, written for the Dudok Quartet Amsterdam (2021) by Max Knigge
 the Nachtstück (1980–83) for viola and chamber orchestra by Volker David Kirchner
 Franz Waxman, Fantasy based on themes from the opera, for violin and orchestra

In popular culture

Aubrey Beardsley's pen and ink drawing The Wagnerites shows highly coiffured men and women attending a performance of Tristan und Isolde. The drawing was first published in the Yellow Book, vol III [October 1894]. According to Stephen Calloway,  'Beardsley had an obsessive interest in Wagner, and avidly attended the London performances of the works. This depiction of the Wagnerian audience rather than the action of the opera identified by the fallen programme as Tristan and Isolde, is one of the greatest masterpieces of Beardsley's manière noire. Sickert claimed to have warned him that the drawings in which the area of black exceeded that of white paper were bound to fail artistically, and to have 'convinced him' of the truth of this aesthetic rule. Fortunately Beardsley seems to have ignored the advice.' The drawing is in the collection of The Victoria and Albert Museum.

The following year Beardsley produced a print depicting a stylised image of a woman, standing in front of a half length yellow curtain, wearing an ornate flowered hat and holding a large drinking vessel to her mouth. In the bottom right-hand corner is the word ISOLDE. Isolde was first reproduced in colour lithography (red, green, grey and black) as a supplement to The Studio, October 1895. The drawing (in yellow, black and white) is in the collection of The Victoria and Albert Museum.

The opera forms the backdrop of Horacio Quiroga's tale of love lost,  (The Death of Isolde) from his collection  (1917).

In Alfred Hitchcock's 1963 film The Birds, a  recording of Tristan is prominently displayed in the scene in which Annie (Suzanne Pleshette) resignedly reveals to Melanie (Tippi Hedren) her unrequited love for Mitch. For Camille Paglia, the visual inclusion of the LP cover, with the opera's 'theme of self-immolation through doomed love' signifies that Annie is a forlorn romantic.

Dalit Warshaw's concerto for piano and orchestra, Conjuring Tristan, draws on the opera's leitmotifs to recast the narrative and dramatic events of Thomas Mann's Tristan through Wagner's music. Warshaw was inspired by developments in Mann's mediation of the Tristan legend which see a former pianist's love for music rekindled by the opera's score.

Lars von Trier's 2011 film Melancholia prominently features music from the prelude.

The famous Liebestod is used in the soundtrack of the third episode of the first season of The Crown.

References

Notes

Sources

 
 
 
 
 
 
 
 
 
 
 
 
 
 
  (Volume 1 and 2 at Google Books)
  (Includes libretto, English translation by Andrew Porter, introduction by John Luke Rose, and commentaries.)

Further reading

 Borchmeyer, Dieter (2003). Drama and the World of Richard Wagner. Princeton: Princeton University Press. 
 Chafe, Eric (2005). The Tragic and the Ecstatic: The Musical Revolution of Wagner's Tristan und Isolde. Oxford: Oxford University Press. .
 Fabinger, Carollina (2009). Tristano e Isotta. Una piccola storia sul destino e sull'amore eterno (illustrated version, in Italian). Milan: Nuages. .
 
 
 Gut, Serge (2014), Tristan et Isolde. Paris: Fayard. .
 May, Thomas (2004). Decoding Wagner. Pompton Plains, New Jersey: Amadeus Press. .
 Scruton, Roger (2004). Death-Devoted Heart: Sex and the Sacred in Wagner's Tristan and Isolde. Oxford: Oxford University Press. .
 Wagner, Richard; Mottl, Felix, editor (1911 or slightly later). Tristan und Isolde (full score). Leipzig: C. F. Peters. Reprint by Dover (1973): .

External links

 Bilingual side by side German English Libretto Also available in Italian
 Wagner Operas. A comprehensive website featuring photographs of productions, recordings, librettos, and sound files.
 Richard Wagner – Tristan und Isolde. A gallery of historic postcards with motifs from Richard Wagner's operas.
 Recordings of Tristan and Isolde rated. Recordings reviewed by Geoffrey Riggs.
 Wagner's Tristan and Isolde BBC / Metropolitan Opera synopsis
 Tristan und Isolde resource site Comprehensive website containing source material and musical motives
 Seattle Opera Performance Seattle Opera link
Free Online opera guide on Tristan und Isolde: An opera portrait with synopsis, commentary, music analysis, anecdotes

1865 operas
German-language operas
Tristan and Iseult
Music dramas
Operas by Richard Wagner
Libretti by Richard Wagner
Operas
Operas set in France
Operas set in the British Isles
Arthurian operas